Jonathan Oliver Gale is an English cricketer  who plays for England cricket team Learning Disability's squad and Surrey County Cricket Club Pan-Disability (1st XI) squad as an Opening batsmen and Wicket Keeper.  He is also the captain and a player-coach for the 1st XI, as well as an assistant coach for the 2nd XI.

Off the pitch, Gale is a programme ambassador for the Lord's Taverners 'Super 1s' programme, and an ambassador the UK Sports Association for People with a Learning Disability's (UKSAPLD) project ‘My Sport, My Voice!’.

References

1994 births
Living people
Cricketers from Greater London